The first and only school shooting in New Zealand history, the Waikino school shooting took place on 19 October 1923 at Waikino School in Waikino, near Waihi, in the Waikato district of New Zealand's North Island. It claimed the lives of two students, Kelvin McLean, aged 13, and Charles Stewart, aged 9. Six others were wounded. The gunman, John Christopher Higgins, was later convicted of murder and sentenced to death. The death sentence was commuted to life imprisonment. Higgins later had his conviction quashed, on the grounds of insanity.

Aftermath

Shortly after the shooting, the two-room school house was burnt to the ground, to be rebuilt in 1925.

The head of the school, Robert Theodore Reid, was wounded in the shooting and resigned, subsequently being involved in correspondence education.  Higgins' wife, a Canadian, returned to Canada.

References 

1923 in New Zealand
1923 mass shootings
1920s mass shootings in New Zealand
Deaths by firearm in New Zealand
Hauraki District
October 1923 crimes
October 1923 events in New Zealand
School killings in New Zealand
School shootings in New Zealand
Two-room schoolhouses
1923 murders in New Zealand
Mass shootings in New Zealand
Attacks on buildings and structures in New Zealand